Classification 9–12 of the Adriatic League took place between 28 February 2018 and it will end on 14 March 2018.

Ninth place game

Game 1

Game 2

Eleventh place game

Game 1

Game 2

Notes
 All times given below are in Central European Time (for the match played in Turkey is time expressed in Further-eastern European Time).

References

External links
Official website

Classification 9-12